is a Japanese manga series written and illustrated by Wakabi Asayama. It has been serialized in Shogakukan's shōnen manga magazine Weekly Shōnen Sunday since January 2022.

Publication
Written and illustrated by Wakabi Asayama, Last Karte: Hōjūi Gakusha Tōma Kenshō no Kioku''' started in Shogakukan's shōnen manga magazine Weekly Shōnen Sunday on January 19, 2022. Shogakukan has collected its chapters into individual tankōbon'' volumes. The first volume was released on March 17, 2022.

Volume list

References

External links
  

Fictional veterinarians
Medical anime and manga
Mystery anime and manga
Shogakukan manga
Shōnen manga